Emmanuel Gros (born 28 July 1978) is a retired French football midfielder.

References

1978 births
Living people
French footballers
Nîmes Olympique players
Dijon FCO players
Stade Beaucairois players
FC Martigues players
Association football midfielders
Ligue 2 players